The Cody Scarp or Cody Escarpment is located in north and north central Florida United States. It is a relict scarp and ancient persistent topographical feature formed from an ancient early Pleistocene shorelines of ~1.8 million to 10,000 years BP during interglacial periods. The Cody Scarp has a slope of 5% to 12%.

The Cody Scarp runs from just east of the Apalachicola River to Alachua County. It is the boundary over that range between the Gulf Coastal Lowlands and the Northern Highlands of Florida. The Gulf Coast Lowlands have only a thin layer of soil over limestone, while the Northern Highlands consist of plateaus of sand, clay and carbonate rock. The Cody Scarp and the Gulf Coastal Lowlands are karst landscapes, with many sinkholes, springs, underground streams, and related features.

It is a remnant of two Pleistocene interglacial shorelines. The first shoreline is known as the Okefenokee Terrace. The second is known as the Wicomico Terrace.

In Jefferson County to the east, the scarp coincides with the Wicomico Terrace with an elevation at 40–45 feet above mean sea level.
 
The scarp separates the Hawthorn Group of fine to medium grained sandy clays and silty, clayey sands of the Red Hills Region of north Florida and southwest Georgia to the north from the fine to medium fine grained, partially recrystallized, silty to sandy limestones of the Gulf Coastal Lowlands to the south. A dramatic difference in elevation is seen here as the Red Hills, at a maximum of  mean sea level (MSL), drops to the area known as the Woodville Karst Plain, an elevation of  within .

On the Woodville Karst Plain, the Suwannee Limestone of the Floridan Aquifer is shallow and exposed in many places. This is the primary recharge area for Wakulla Springs and where the aquifer is most vulnerable to pollution on the land surface. It is also a zone of high sinkhole activity.

In Alachua County, Florida this westward-facing escarpment between an upland plateau to the east and a karst plain to the west has elevations up to  mean sea level (MSL). The Cody Scarp runs right through Gainesville, Florida.

Sources

External links
Red Hills & Gulf Coastal Lowlands Bioregions

Landforms of Florida
Escarpments of the United States
Regions of Florida
Geography of Florida
Geography of Jefferson County, Florida
Geography of Leon County, Florida
Geography of Alachua County, Florida
North Florida
Landforms of Jefferson County, Florida
Landforms of Leon County, Florida
Landforms of Alachua County, Florida